Viktor Külföldi, real name Jakab Mayer-Rubcsics, born Jacob Mayer (1844  March 5, 1894) was a Hungarian Socialist, journalist, and lecturer.

Born in Thalheim, Germany (or Switzerland?), he was known in his adopted country by the alias  (Hungarian for "foreigner").
In 1871 he became a member of the International Working Men's Association. For organizing a strike by the GWMU, he, among others, was arrested (18712) and accused of high treason; he was eventually acquitted because of lack of evidence.

In 1877 Külföldi founded the Social-democratic newspaper  ("People's Voice"). He retired from the worker's movement in 1890 and died in Budapest in 1894.

Publications

References 

1844 births
1894 deaths
Hungarian socialists
Hungarian journalists
Hungarian people of German descent
19th-century journalists
Male journalists
19th-century Hungarian male writers